Sugrib Singh (1 August 1963 – 26 April 2021) was a member of the 14th Lok Sabha of India.

Biography
He represented the Phulbani constituency of Orissa from 2004 to 2009 and was a member of the Biju Janata Dal (BJD) political party.

Singh died from COVID-19 on 26 April 2021.

References

External links
 Members of Fourteenth Lok Sabha - Parliament of India website

People from Odisha
Odisha politicians
Biju Janata Dal politicians
India MPs 2004–2009
1963 births
2021 deaths
Lok Sabha members from Odisha
People from Phulbani
Deaths from the COVID-19 pandemic in India